Dieter Zurwehme (born July 2, 1942 in Bochum) is a German criminal and mass murderer. He is responsible for the murder of five people and numerous other serious crimes and gained nationwide attention in the first half of 1999 following a several-month escape from custody. The escapes were followed closely by the media and announced an arrest reward of 10,000 Deutsche Mark.

Life 
Zurwehme the son of an Algerian and a German. He grew up with adoptive parents in Ottbergen, a district of Höxter in the Weser Uplands, and became a criminal when at the age of 12, when he tried to rob a 15-year-old. At 16, he was given his first sentence to theft and embezzlement. In November 1972, Zurwehme killed an employee of a real estate agency during a robbery in Düren. Because of this, he was sentenced in 1974 for murder and in majority for sex and robbery offenses and vehicle thefts by the district court of Aachen, with one of the charges landing him into life imprisonment.

During detention at the Bielefeld-Brackwede Prison, psychologists saw an apparent change of personality; for example, he learned Latin and French in prison and received prison leaves from 1988 onwards for his good leadership. In 1997, he was transferred to an open prison.

On December 2, 1998, Zurwehme did not return from his 166th clearance. His track was lost quickly and the police investigation was unsuccessful. After his escape on March 21, 1999 in Remagen, he killed four older people: one 71-year-old who recognized him was stabbed in his villa he lived in. When the victim's cellphone rang, Zurwehme answered and told his victim's wife that something had happened to her husband, and that he wanted to tell her everything else in a personal conversation. After the shocked wife had given him her address, he went to her house and killed her, her brother and sister-in-law the same way. Then he continued his escape, where he kept afloat with money from robberies and temporary jobs. In addition, he committed a rape, and fled to several places: Bochum, Remagen, Lindau, Dessau, Frankfurt, Calw, Baden-Baden, Freiburg im Breisgau and Cuxhaven. In the course of his flight, he being able to flee from surrounded maze fields or flee only minutes before the police's arrival. Through several determining margins the police investigation was even more difficult. In the weekly program Kripo live on MDR Fernsehen, on the evening of June 27, 1999, the public was called upon to report pertinent observations about complicity, known to be travelling with a walking stick and a backpack. Amongst the numerous callers was a waitress from Heldrungen, who stated that he stayed at a hotel where she worked at day and slept in overnight with a hiking stick and a backpack. During the night, the hotel guest, 62-year-old Friedhelm Beate from Cologne, was shot dead in his hotel room by local police officers on the assumption that he was the fugitive.

On August 19, 1999, a car driver in Greifswald, who only a few days earlier had seen his picture in a television report, saw Zurwehme. The summoned police officers were able to arrest and detain the criminal. When asked about his ID card, Zurwehme recognized his hopelessness and said that: "I am the one you seek". By virtue of four counts of murder, aggravated rape, robbery, rape, coercion and false imprisonment, the district court of Koblenz condemned Zurwehme in June 2000 to life imprisonment with subsequent preventative detention. He remains imprisoned at a prison in Bochum. On February 15, 2001, Zurwehme married a waitress from the Berlin district of Spandau.

Another fourfold murder of Dutch holidaymakers which occurred in a country house in Southern France during Zurwehme's escape on May 22, 1999, was also initially associated with him. However, this suspicion was later excluded.

Press articles 

 Peter Brock: "The last process" in www.berliner-zeitung.de (Berliner Zeitung). Accessed on February 20, 2010 (in German)
 "The trace is lost and lost again" in spiegel.de (Spiegel Online). Accessed on February 20, 2010 (in German)
 "Zurwehme got married in prison" in www.berliner-zeitung.de (Berliner Zeitung). Accessed on February 20, 2010 (in German)
 Detlef Sieverdingbeck, Thomas van Zütphen: "Trust in a killer" in focus.de (Focus). Accessed on February 20, 2010 (in German)
 "Clearance despite warnings" in spiegel.de (Spiegel Online). Accessed on February 20, 2010 (in German)

References 

1942 births
German mass murderers
1972 murders in Germany
Living people
Criminals from North Rhine-Westphalia
German adoptees
1990 murders in Germany